The Japanese  is the Japanese domestic counterpart to the IUCN Red List of Threatened Species. The national Red List is compiled and maintained by the Ministry of the Environment, alongside a separate Red List for marine organisms. Similarly drawing on the relevant scientific authorities, NGOs, and local governments, the Ministry of the Environment also prepares and publishes a  that provides further information on species and habitats.

The first Red List was published by the then Environmental Agency as part of the first Red Data Book in 1991; in 2020, the fifth edition of the fourth version of the Red List was published. In line with the Marine Biodiversity Conservation Strategy, decided upon by the Ministry in 2011, in 2017 the first Marine Life Red List was published, excluding species subject to international agreements, such as those within the remit of the Western and Central Pacific Fisheries Commission (WCPFC) (e.g., Pacific bluefin tuna) and International Whaling Commission (IWC), species under evaluation by the Fisheries Agency, smaller Cetaceans, and those already evaluated for the Red List.

With the renewed focus on evaluating the rarity or otherwise of marine life in line with the National Biodiversity Strategy 2012–2020, using the same evaluation criteria and categories as the Ministry of the Environment, and working in collaboration with the Ministry, the Fisheries Agency has also produced a Red List of marine resources and smaller Cetaceans, excluding species subject to international agreements, such as those in the remit of the WCPFC and IWC. Evaluations of 94 species were published in 2017, all falling outside the rankings (i.e., being of Least Concern), other than Pleuronichthys japonicus (Data Deficient).

The Red List (and Red Data Book) itself has no legal force but is intended to be used to provide information and to serve as a "warning to society". Appropriate action may be taken under the 1992 Conservation of Endangered Species of Wild Fauna and Flora Act [ja].

Classification
As of the 2020 edition, thirteen taxa are used for classification purposes by the Ministry of the Environment:

Fauna

Flora

Five further taxa are used for the Marine Life Red List:

The following categories are used to indicate organisms' conservation status specifically within Japan; where a species or subspecies is endemic, the status EX (Extinct) is indicative of its global status.

Statistics

Extinct taxa
 Mammals: Hokkaido wolf (Canis lupus hattai), Japanese wolf (Canis lupus hodophilax), Japanese river otter (Lutra lutra nippon), Hokkaido river otter (Lutra lutra whiteleyi), Okinawa flying fox (Pteropus loochoensis) ,  (Rhinolophus pumilus miyakonis), Bonin pipistrelle (Pipistrellus sturdeei) 
 Birds: Crested shelduck (Tadorna cristata) , Ryukyu wood pigeon (Columba jouyi) , Bonin wood pigeon (Columba versicolor) , Bonin nankeen night heron (Nycticorax caledonicus crassirostris) , Iwo Jima rail (Porzana cinerea brevipes) , Daito buzzard (Buteo buteo oshiroi), Ryukyu kingfisher (Todiramphus miyakoensis), Tristram's woodpecker (Dryocopus javensis richardsi), Izu Peregrine falcon (Falco peregrinus furuitii), Daito varied tit, (Poecile varius orii), Mukojima white-eye (Apalopteron familiare familiare), Daito wren (Troglodytes troglodytes orii), Bonin thrush (Cichlopasser terrestris) , Southern Ryukyu robin (Luscinia komadori subrufus), Bonin grosbeak (Chaunoproctus ferreorostris)  
 Brackish and Freshwater Fish: Green sturgeon (Acipenser medirostris), Gnathopogon elongatus suwae, Amur stickleback (Pungitius kaibarae)
 Insects: Ishikawatrechus intermedius, Rakantrechus elegans, Prodaticus satoi [ja], Macroplea japana
 Molluscs: Ogasawarana chichijimana , Ogasawarana habei , Ogasawarana rex , Assiminea sp. D, Hirasea diplomphalus latispira, Hirasea eutheca , Hirasea goniobasis , Hirasea hypolia , Hirasea major , Hirasea nesiotica liobasis, Hirasea planulata biconcava, Hirasea planulata planulata, Hirasea profundispira , Hirasea sinuosa , Hirasiella clara , Lamprocystis hahajimana pachychilus, Trochochlamys ogasawarana , Vitrinula chichijimana , Vitrinula hahajimana 
 Other Invertebrates: Compressalges nipponiae
 Vascular Plants: Elatostema lineolatum var. majus, Ranunculus gmelinii, Rubus hatsushimae, Flemingia strobilifera, Lespedeza hisauchii, Euphrasia insignis insignis var. omiensis, Euphrasia insignis insignis var. pubigera, Euphrasia multifolia var. kirisimana, Cirsium toyoshimae, Aletris makiyataroi, Burmannia coelestris, Thismia tuberculata, Eriocaulon cauliferum, Cyperus diaphanus, Cyperus procerus, Fimbristylis leptoclada var. takamineana, Fimbristylis pauciflora, Acanthephippium striatum
Algae: Chara fibrosa var. brevibracteata,  var. hakonensis, Nitella minispora, Porphyra angusta
Lichens: Erioderma tomentosum, Heterodermia angustiloba, Heterodermia leucomelos, Siphula ceratites
Fungi: Agaricus hahashimensis, Albatrellus cantharellus, Camarophyllus microbicolor, Chlorophyllum agaricoides, Circulocolumella hahashimensis, Clitocybe castaneofloccosa, Collybia matris, Coprinus boninensis, Cyathus boninensis, Ganoderma colossus, Gymnopilus noviholocirrhus, Hygrocybe macrospora, Hygrocybe miniatostriata, Lactarius ogasawarashimensis, Lentinus lamelliporus, Lepiota boninensis, Leptoglossum boninense, Lycoperdon henningsii, Pleurotus cyatheae, Pluteus daidoi, Pluteus horridilamellus, Psathyrella boninensis, Pyrrhoglossum subpurpureum, Rhodophyllus brunneolus, Russula boninensis
 Coral: Merulina coral (Boninastrea boninensis)

Prefectural Red Lists
Localized Red Lists and Red Data are also prepared and published by a number of Prefectural Governments, including those of Hokkaidō and Okinawa.

See also
 Natural Habitat Conservation Areas (Japan)
 Wildlife Protection Areas (Japan)
 Convention on Biological Diversity
 Wildlife of Japan

References

External links
  2020 Japanese Red List
  2020 and Previous Japanese Red Lists
  MOE Marine Organisms Red List
  JFA Marine Organisms Red List
 IUCN Red List

Nature conservation in Japan
Biota by conservation status system
Lists of biota
Biological databases

ja:レッドリスト#日本におけるレッドリスト